A series of riots took place in July 2009 in France. On Bastille Day in the commune of Montreuil, an eastern suburb area of Paris, French youths set fire to 317 cars. Thirteen police officers were injured. On July 9, many youths started a protest in Firminy near Saint-Étienne, after the death of a young Algerian man, Mohamed Benmouna, in police custody. Benmouna's parents rejected the official account of suicide. Riots on Bastille day are a frequent occurrence in France as the disaffected protest high unemployment rates and failed integration policies for minorities. More than 240 people had been arrested near Paris.

The injured officers suffered mainly from hearing difficulties after having been targeted by youths armed with fireworks and small-scale home-made explosives.

See also

2013 Trappes riots
2013 Stockholm riots
2011 England riots
2010 Rinkeby riots
2007 Villiers-le-Bel riots
2006 Brussels riots
2005 French riots
2001 England riots

References

Riots
French
Riots
Contemporary French history
Riots and civil disorder in France
Bastille Day